Isotrias huemeri is a species of moth of the family Tortricidae. It is found on Monti del Pollino in Italy.

References

Moths described in 1993
Polyorthini
Moths of Europe